State Route 1005 is a short,  road located in Delaware county in Pennsylvania.

History
A portion of SR 1005 was Pennsylvania Route 105. The western terminus was at PA 3 in Havertown.  The eastern terminus was at US 30/PA 201 in Ardmore. 

In 1987, a Location Referencing System (LRS) was established to define roadways that the Pennsylvania Department of Transportation deemed important. The system added the concept of a quadrant route, a road given a uniform four digit number between 1000 and 4000 that was unique per county. Quadrant routes would only be signed in little white markers placed at major intersections. With the creation of the LRS; Drexel Avenue, Eagle Road, and Wynnewood Road were assigned the number of 1005.

Major intersections

See also

References

External links

105
Delaware 1005